Johann Georg Rauch may refer to:

 Johann Georg Rauch (composer) (1658–1710), German composer and organist at Strasbourg Cathedral
 Johann Georg Rauch (politician) ((1789 – 1851), Swiss politician and playing card manufacturer